The Clairvoyant  (French: La voyante) is a 1924 French silent drama film directed by Leon Abrams and starring Sarah Bernhardt, Georges Melchior and Harry Baur. It was based on a play by Sacha Guitry. This was the final film of the celebrated stage actress Sarah Bernhardt who died during production.

Plot
Jean is thrown out of the house by his father, a remarried politician, out of jealousy for his friendship with his mother-in-law. He finds refuge at an artist's apartment. In the same building lives a famous fortune teller that the mother-in-law just happens to consult. With her help, Jean will be able to marry his young sweetheart and his father will solve his political troubles.

Cast
 Sarah Bernhardt as Madame Gainard 
 Georges Melchior as Jean Detaille 
 Harry Baur as Monsieur Detaille 
 Mary Marquet as Madame Detaille 
 Jean-François Martial as André Renaud 
 Lili Damita as Suzanne 
 Pâquerette as La concierge 
 Jeanne Brindeau as Madame Gainard's Double
 Sacha Guitry
 Paul Poiret as Couturier 
 Philippe Richard as André Renaud 
 Jean Wells

References

Bibliography
 David W. Menefee. The First Female Stars: Women of the Silent Era. Greenwood Publishing Group, 2004.

External links 
 

1924 films
French drama films
French silent feature films
1924 drama films
1920s French-language films

French black-and-white films
Silent drama films
1920s French films